The Ochsehorn is a mountain of the Swiss Pennine Alps, overlooking Staldenried in the canton of Valais. It lies between the Saastal and the upper Nanztal, north of the Mattwaldhorn.

References

External links
 Ochsehorn on Hikr

Mountains of the Alps
Mountains of Switzerland
Mountains of Valais
Two-thousanders of Switzerland